Raghnall Mac Ruaidhrí (died October 1346) was an eminent Scottish magnate and chief of Clann Ruaidhrí. Raghnall's father, Ruaidhrí Mac Ruaidhrí, appears to have been slain in 1318, at a time when Raghnall may have been under age. Ruaidhrí himself appears to have faced resistance over the Clann Ruaidhrí lordship from his sister, Cairistíona, wife of Donnchadh, a member of the comital family of Mar. Following Ruaidhrí's demise, there is evidence indicating that Cairistíona and her powerful confederates also posed a threat to the young Raghnall. Nevertheless, Raghnall eventually succeeded to his father, and first appears on record in 1337.

Raghnall's possession of his family's expansive ancestral territories in the Hebrides and West Highlands put him in conflict with the neighbouring magnate William III, Earl of Ross, and contention between the two probably contributed to Raghnall's assassination at the hands of the earl's adherents in 1346. Following his death, the Clann Ruaidhrí territories passed through his sister, Áine, into the possession of her husband, the chief of Clann Domhnaill, Eóin Mac Domhnaill I, Lord of the Isles, resulting in the latter's consolidation of power in the Hebrides as Lord of the Isles.

Clann Ruaidhrí

The fifteenth-century National Library of Scotland Advocates' 72.1.1 (MS 1467) accords Raghnall with an epithet meaning "white". He was an illegitimate son of Ruaidhrí Mac Ruaidhrí, grandson of the eponymous ancestor of Clann Ruaidhrí. The identity of Raghnall's mother is unknown. Raghnall's father controlled a provincial lordship which encompassed the mainland territories of Moidart, Arisaig, Morar, and Knoydart; and the island territories of Rhum, Eigg, Barra, St Kilda, and Uist. This dominion, like the great lordships of Annandale and Galloway, was comparable to the kingdom's thirteen earldoms. There is reason to suspect that the rights to the family's territories were contested after Ruaidhrí's death. In fact, Ruaidhrí himself was illegitimate, and only gained formal control of the lordship after his legitimate half-sister, Cairistíona, resigned her rights to him at some point during the reign of Robert I, King of Scotland.

Raghnall's father appears to be identical to the Clann Ruaidhrí dynast—styled "King of the Hebrides"—who lost his life in the service of the Bruce campaign in Ireland in 1318. At the time, Raghnall may well have been under age, and it is apparent that Cairistíona and her confederates again attempted to seize control of the inheritance. Although she is recorded to have resigned her claimed rights to a certain Artúr Caimbéal at some point after Ruaidhrí's death, it is clear that Raghnall succeeded in securing the region, and was regarded as the chief of Clann Ruaidhrí by most of his kin.

In 1325, a certain "" suffered the forfeiture of his possessions by Robert I. Although this record could refer to a member of Clann Domhnaill, another possibility is that the individual actually refers to a member of Clann Ruaidhrí, and that the record evinces contrasting relations between Clann Ruaidhrí and the Scottish Crown in the 1320s and 1330s. If this record indeed refers to a member of Clann Ruaidhrí, the man in question may well have been Raghnall himself. If so, the forfeiture could have stemmed from resistance advanced by Raghnall to counter Cairistíona's attempts to alienate the Clann Ruaidhrí estate from him and transfer it into the clutches of the Caimbéalaigh. Alternately, the forfeiture could have been ratified in response to undesirable Clann Ruaidhrí expansion into certain neighbouring regions, such as the former territories of the disinherited Clann Dubhghaill.

Although Cairistíona's resignation charter to Artúr is undated, it could date to just before the forfeiture. The list of witnesses who attested the grant is remarkable, and may reveal that the charter had royal approval. The witnesses include: John Menteith, Domhnall Caimbéal, Alasdair Mac Neachdainn, Eóghan Mac Íomhair, Donnchadh Caimbéal (son of Tomás Caimbéal), Niall Mac Giolla Eáin, and (the latter's brother) Domhnall Mac Giolla Eáin. These men all seem to have been close adherents of Robert I against Clann Dubhghaill, and all represented families of power along the western seaboard. An alliance of such men may well have been an intimidating prospect to the Clann Ruaidhrí leadership.

The forfeiture could have been personally reinforced by Robert I, as he seems to have travelled to Tarbert Castle—an imposing royal stronghold in Kintyre—within the same year. There is reason to suspect that the establishment of the Caimbéalaigh constabulary of Dunstaffnage formed part of a plan to create a new western sheriffdom based at Tarbert. Although the king had previously allowed the succession of Raghnall's father in the first decade of the century, it is evident that by the early 1320s the Scottish Crown was allowing and assisting in the expansion of families such as the Caimbéalaigh at the expense of families like Clann Ruaidhrí. In fact, it may have been at the Scone parliament of 1323—perhaps at the same time that work on Tarbert Castle was authorised—that the constabulary was granted to the Caimbéalaigh, along with lands in Benderloch, Ardnastaffnage, Inverawe, and other places in Lorn. This royal grant may well have overturned previous grants of former Clann Dubhghaill possessions to members of Clann Ruaidhrí.

Career

Unlike the First War of Scottish Independence, in which Clann Ruaidhrí participated, Raghnall and his family are not known to have taken part in the second war (from 1332–41). In fact, Raghnall certainly appears on record by 1337, when he aided his third cousin, Eóin Mac Domhnaill I, Lord of the Isles, in the latter's efforts to receive a papal dispensation to marry Raghnall's sister, Áine, in 1337. At the time, Raghnall and Eóin were apparently supporters of Edward Balliol, a claimant to the Scottish throne who held power in the realm from 1332 to 1336. By June 1343, however, both Raghnall and Eóin were reconciled with Edward's rival, the reigning son of Robert I, David II, King of Scotland, and Raghnall himself was confirmed in the Clann Ruaidhrí lordship by the king.

At about this time, Raghnall received the rights to Kintail from William III, Earl of Ross, a transaction which was confirmed by the king that July. There is reason to suspect that the king's recognition of this grant may have been intended as a regional counterbalance of sorts, since he also diverted the rights to Skye from Eóin to William III. It is also possible that Clann Ruaidhrí power had expanded into the coastal region of Kintail at some point after the death of William III's father in 1333, during a period when William III may have been either a minor or exiled from the country. Whatever the case, the earl seems to have had little choice but to relinquish his rights to Kintail to Raghnall.

Bitterness between these two magnates appears to be evidenced in dramatic fashion by the assassination of Raghnall and several of his followers at the hands of the earl and his adherents. Raghnall's murder unfolded at Elcho Priory in October 1346, and is attested by numerous sources, such as the fifteenth-century Scotichronicon, the fifteenth-century Orygynale Cronykil of Scotland, the fifteenth-century Liber Pluscardensis, and the seventeenth-century Sleat History. At the time of his demise, Raghnall had been obeying the king's muster at Perth, in preparation for the Scots' imminent invasion of England. Following the deed, William III deserted the royal host, and fled to the safety of his domain. What is known of William III's comital career reveals that it was local, rather than national issues, that laid behind his recorded actions. The murder of Raghnall and the earl's desertion—a flight which likely left his king with a substantially smaller fighting-force—is one such example. David II was captured, only days later, in battle against the English—a fact that may explain how William III was able to escape censure for the slaying. Although William III was later to pay dearly for his disertion, his part in the murder evinces his determination to deal with the threat of encroachment of Clann Ruaidhrí power into what he regarded as his own domain. Despite this dramatic removal of William III's main rival, the most immediate beneficiary of the killing was Eóin, the chief of Clann Domhnaill, a man who was also William III's brother-in-law.

Following Raghnall's death, control of the Clann Ruaidhrí estate passed to Eóin by right of his wife. Although Áine appears to have been either dead or divorced from Eóin by 1350, the Clann Ruaidhrí territories evidently remained in Eóin's possession after his subsequent marriage to Margaret, daughter of Robert Stewart, Steward of Scotland. David himself died in 1371, and was succeeded by his uncle, Robert Stewart (as Robert II). In 1371/1372, the recently-crowned king confirmed Eóin's rights to the former Clann Ruaidhrí territories. The following year, Robert II confirmed Eóin's grant of these lands to Raghnall Mac Domhnaill—Eóin and Áine's eldest surviving son—a man apparently named after Raghnall himself.

Raghnall seems to have had a brother, Eóghan, who received a grant to the thanage of Glen Tilt from the Steward. The transaction appears to date to before 1346, at about the time members of Clann Ruaidhrí were operating as gallowglasses in Ireland. This could in turn indicate that the Steward was using the kindred in a military capacity to extend his own power eastwards into Atholl, where he appears to have also made use of connections with Clann Donnchaidh. If certain fifteenth-century pedigrees are two be believed, Raghnall had at least one illegitimate son, and his descendants continued to act as leaders of Clann Ruaidhrí.

Ancestry

Notes

Citations

References

Primary sources

Secondary sources

External links
 

1346 deaths
14th-century Scottish people
Assassinated Scottish people
Raghnall
Medieval Gaels from Scotland
Scottish clan chiefs